Wilbur McGaugh (March 12, 1895–January 31, 1965) was an American film actor of the silent era, appearing mostly in westerns. He also directed five films. He also worked extensively as an assistant director in film and television.

McGaugh's career changed with the advent of sound films. Described as "sadly inept in front of the microphones", he began working off-camer and became an assistant director for films in the 1930s and 1940s.

Selected filmography

 Devil Dog Dawson (1921)
 The Broken Spur (1921)
 Cupid's Brand (1921)
 Dead or Alive (1921)
 Hills of Hate (1921)
 The Sheriff of Hope Eternal (1921)
 Peaceful Peters (1922)
 One Eighth Apache (1922)
 At Devil's Gorge (1923)
 The Law Rustlers (1923)
 The Santa Fe Trail (1923)
 Branded a Bandit (1924)
 Cupid's Rustler (1924)
 Bringin' Home the Bacon (1924)
 The Fugitive (1925)
 Roped by Radio (1925)
 Bad Man's Bluff (1926)
 Three Pals (1926)
 The Fire Fighters (1927)
 The Sky Skidder (1929)
 The Indians Are Coming (1930)

References

External links

1895 births
1965 deaths
American film directors
American male film actors
People from Los Angeles
Male Western (genre) film actors